The 2021 World Weightlifting Championships was a weightlifting competition held from 7 to 17 December in Tashkent, Uzbekistan.

Due to concerns about the rapid spread of Omicron variant and held shortly after Olympics and Chinese National Games, the tournament faced the absence of many strong competitors. 10 Olympic champions from Tokyo four months earlier, 15 world champion title holders, and entire teams from China, North Korea, Italy and Germany decided not to compete. Weightlifters competing at the event were exempt from the required quarantine when visiting Uzbekistan.

The event was also designated the 2021 Commonwealth Weightlifting Championships, with places in the 2022 Commonwealth Games awarded to the best Commonwealth lifter (totals only, as per the Olympics) in each eligible division.

Medal summary

Men

Women

Medal table
Ranking by Big (Total result) medals

Ranking by all medals: Big (Total result) and Small (Snatch and Clean & Jerk)

Team ranking

Men

Women

Participating nations
A total of 414 competitors from 72 nations participated.

 (5)
 (2)
 (10)
 (8)
 (1)
 (2)
 (4)
 (2)
 (3)
 (5)
 (4)
 (13)
 (10)
 (14)
 (2)
 (1)
 (4)
 (5)
 (7)
 (7)
 (2)
 (3)
 (2)
 (10)
 (3)
 (4)
 (3)
 (2)
 (1)
 (4)
 (19)
 (14)
 (13)
 (1)
 (4)
 (5)
 (4)
 (7)
 (3)
 (3)
 (5)
 (3)
 (4)
 (2)
 (5)
 (2)
 (2)
 (2)
 (7)
 (3)
 (4)
 (10)
 (1)
 (1)
 Russian Weightlifting Federation (19)
 (4)
 (1)
 (3)
 (15)
 (9)
 (19)
 (3)
 (2)
 (14)
 (1)
 (6)
 (10)
 (4)
 (8)
 (10)
 (14)
 (5)

References

External links
Results
Results book

 
World Weightlifting Championships
World Championships
Weightlifting Championships
International weightlifting competitions hosted by Uzbekistan
Sports competitions in Tashkent
World Weightlifting Championships